Wim Trengove SC is a South African advocate best known for his role in the development of South African Constitutional jurisprudence and his involvement in high-profile political cases.

Career 
Wim Trengove has litigated many of South Africa's most important human rights questions, including arguing for the successful abolition of the death penalty in S v Makwanyane, arguing against discrimination on the basis of HIV status in Hoffmann v South African Airways, arguing for the protection of sex workers' labour rights in Kylie v CCMA, arguing for the restitution of land and mineral rights to groups dispossessed during apartheid in Alexkor Ltd v Richtersveld Community, and arguing for the roll-out of anti-retroviral treatment for HIV patients in Minister of Health v Treatment Action Campaign. Trengove also argued numerous constitutional questions in South Africa's Constitutional Court, including the certification of the constitution itself. Trengove also represented mineworkers in a class action to claim damages from mining companies for damages due to the widespread contraction of silicosis; the $400 million settlement in favor of the miners was the largest in South African history.

Trengove has been active in high-profile political cases, representing former president Nelson Mandela, including in his divorce from Winnie Madikizela-Mandela, leading the prosecution of former president Jacob Zuma on charges of corruption, and representing President Cyril Ramaphosa in his dispute with the Public Protector. Trengove was outspoken about the National Prosecuting Authority's decision in 2008 to withdraw the corruption charges against Zuma, criticizing the decision at a public lecture at the University of Cape Town, where Trengove is an honorary professor.

Personal life 
Trengove was born to Afrikaans parents in Pretoria. Trengove's father, JJ Trengove, was a barrister and judge in South Africa's apex Supreme Court. Trengove studied law at the University of Pretoria.

References 

20th-century South African lawyers
21st-century South African lawyers
Year of birth missing (living people)
Living people
University of Pretoria alumni